The Biomimicry Institute is a 501(c)(3) not-for-profit organization founded in 2006 and based in Missoula, Montana in the United States. Its goal is to help innovators learn from nature in order to design sustainable products, processes, and policies in response to real-world problems. The Biomimicry Institute has become a key communicator in the field of biomimetics, connecting thousands of practitioners and organizations across the world. Its Global Network currently supports 38 regional networks across 26 countries as of 2022.
The Biomimicry Institute was founded by Bryony Schwan, Dayna Baumeister and Janine Benyus
and originated following the publishing of Biomimicry: Innovation Inspired by Nature by Janine Benyus; a natural sciences writer, innovation consultant and author.

Approach

Biomimicry is an approach to design and innovation that finds inspiration in the function of living organisms. The idea of connecting biologists, ecologists and other life scientists with designers and product engineers in the design process was introduced by Janine Benyus. This design methodology can be applied to the creation of materials, products, and solutions for a wide variety of fields and human systems including biochemistry fluid mechanics, physical chemistry, materials design, architecture, energy, textiles, medicine,  transportation, and agriculture.

The Biomimicry Institute supports the development of nature-inspired solutions for the sustainability of the planet. Within the larger field of biomimicry the Institute has three primary objectives, to change the areas of: 
1) Education: Increase access to high quality materials and services for learning, teaching, and practicing biomimicry as a design process.
2) Practice: Develop the proficiency and practice of next generation innovators so that they have the orientation, skills, and support necessary to use biomimicry to tackle pressing sustainability challenges.
3) Culture: Shift the design culture so that biomimicry is widely recognized and used as a tool to advance sustainable and restorative innovation.

History 
In 1998, Benyus and  Dayna Baumeister co-founded the Biomimicry Guild as an innovation consultancy. Their goal was to help innovators learn from and emulate natural models in order to design sustainable products, processes, and policies that create conditions conducive to life.

In 2006, Benyus co-founded  The Biomimicry Institute with Dayna Baumeister and Bryony Schwan. Beth Rattner is Executive Director of the non-profit organization, whose mission is to naturalize biomimicry in the culture by promoting the transfer of ideas, designs, and strategies from biology to sustainable human systems design.
In 2008 the Biomimicry Institute launched AskNature.org,  "an encyclopedia of nature's solutions to common design problems". The Biomimicry Institute has become a key communicator in the field of biomimetics, connecting thousands of practitioners and organizations in 38 regional networks and 26 countries through its Biomimicry Global Network as of 2022.

In 2010, Benyus, Dayna Baumeister, Bryony Schwan, and Christopher Lee Allen formed Biomimicry 3.8, separated their for-profit and nonprofit work by creating a benefit corporation. Biomimicry 3.8, which achieved B-corp certification,  
offers consultancy, professional training, development for educators, and "inspirational speaking".  Among its more than 250 clients are Nike, Kohler. Seventh Generation and C40 Cities.  By 2013, over 100 universities had joined the Biomimicry Educator’s Network, offering training in biomimetics. In 2014, the profit and non-profit aspects again became separate entities, with Biomimicry 3.8 engaging in for-profit consultancy and the Biomimicry Institute as a non-profit organization.

Programs
AskNature is a freely accessible and comprehensive online database that connects nature's solutions with innovation professionals, students, and educators. Launched in 2008,   AskNature contains nearly 1,700 "biological strategies" describing how living systems have adapted to thrive amongst a myriad of conditions and challenges. It also features a catalog of bio-inspired inventions and research projects, and a resource library for people learning about and teaching bio-inspired design. According to the annual report for 2013-2014,  over half a million people had visited AskNature in one year,

The Biomimicry Youth Design Challenge (YDC) is a hands-on, project-based learning experience for middle and high school students.  This STEM challenge provides classroom and informal educators with an interdisciplinary framework that combines science, engineering, and environmental literacy with the envisioning of solutions to social and environmental problems.  Students identify problems, find inspiration in nature, and engineer designs to mitigate their problems. Students combine biological strategies from multiple organisms into their design. For example, a team of seventh graders wanted to reduce the need for harmful ice-melting products. They developed a design to reduce ice buildup on airplane wings after studying the structures of mint leaves, cicada wings and pine needles.

The Ray of Hope Prize® identifies the top nature-inspired startups in the world and fosters their growth by providing sustainable business training, communications support, and opportunities for non-dilutive funding—the top being a $100,000 equity-free prize.

The Biomimicry Launchpad is an accelerator program that supports early-stage entrepreneurs working to bring nature-inspired innovations to market. The Launchpad provides entrepreneurs with resources to launch and grow biomimicry businesses, accelerates the development and commercialization of biomimicry innovations, and helps create new sustainability entrepreneurs.

Design for Decomposition launched in December 2021 and is a two-year, multi-million dollar project dedicated to demonstrating scalable new pathways for the ~92 million tonnes of fashion waste discarded annually by embracing true decomposition—the way leaves break down into soil—that builds healthy ecosystems.

The initiative originated from the 2020 Nature of Fashion report, which identified decomposition as a critical part of nature’s material cycles missing from current industrial thinking, and design for decomposition as the quickest route to a regenerative and equitable fashion industry.

The Biomimicry Global Design Challenge (BGDC) was an annual program that gave scientists, inventors and designers the opportunity to apply biomimicry to create solutions to problems of climate change. Whether emulating the functions of a healthy forest floor to support cost-effective reforestation, or creating a rock-like aggregate that sequesters carbon in concrete (modeled on the formation of shells and coral reefs), the design challenge teams created solutions to man-made problems by learning from nature. Participants received access to training, mentoring, and other resources. Finalists were invited to join the Biomimicry Launchpad to get support to bring their design to market. The program was first announced at the 2014 Annual Meeting of the Clinton Global Initiative. The first two years of the challenge focused on the issue of food insecurity. The Challenge was discontinued in 2021.

References

Non-profit organizations based in Montana
Biomimetics
Sustainability